Flower of Light is a feature film by Ali Noori Oskouie. Flower of light won the award in 29th Fajr International Film Festival.

Plot 

Flower of Light tells the story of little people living in an unknown land. They water their farms with water foundation near their village. Behind the mountain which those people live there, the wizards live that want to affect little people's mind with injecting some medical drugs into water foundation. To be protected from the effects of drugs, little people decide not to use the water, this issue spawns some problems for those people.

References 

2010s children's fantasy films
2010s stop-motion animated films
2011 animated films
2011 films
2011 computer-animated films
Animated films directed by Ali Noori Oskouie
Iranian animated films